Andy Roddick was the defending champion, but did not participate this year.

Richard Gasquet won the tournament, beating Marc Gicquel 6–3, 6–1 in the final.

Seeds

Draw

Finals

Top half

Bottom half

References

 Main Draw
 Qualifying Draw

Singles
2006 ATP Tour